Michael Saunders (born 1986) is a Canadian Major League Baseball center fielder.

Michael Saunders may also refer to:

 Michael Saunders (academic) (born 1944), American numerical analyst and computer scientist
 Michael Saunders (economist), Bank of England Monetary Policy Committee member
 Michael Graham Saunders (1920–1975), neurophysiologist
 Michael Saunders (lawyer) (1944–1996), British lawyer and public servant
 Mike Saunders (musician) (born 1952), rock critic and singer
 Mike Saunders (gridiron football) (born 1969), Canadian Football League running back
 Mike Saunders (footballer) (born 1972), Jamaican soccer player